Cool Glacier is located on east slopes of Glacier Peak in the U.S. state of Washington. As is true with all the glaciers found on Glacier Peak, Cool Glacier is retreating. Since then Cool Glacier resumed retreating and by 2005 the glacier was within  of its minimum length recorded in 1946.

See also
List of glaciers in the United States

References

Glaciers of Glacier Peak
Glaciers of Washington (state)